Euborellia is a genus of earwigs in the subfamily Anisolabidinae. It was cited by Srivastava in Part 2 of Fauna of India. Euborellia are small, dark-colored earwigs. Species can be difficult to distinguish from one another. There are about 50 species.

Species
The genus includes the following species:

Euborellia ambigua
Euborellia angustata
Euborellia annulata
Euborellia annulipes
Euborellia aporonoma
Euborellia arcanum
Euborellia brunneri
Euborellia caraibea
Euborellia cincticollis
Euborellia eteronoma
Euborellia femoralis
Euborellia fulviceps
Euborellia hispanica
Euborellia jeekeli
Euborellia moesta
Euborellia ornata
Euborellia pallipes
Euborellia plebeja
Euborellia sakaii
Euborellia stali

References

Anisolabididae
Dermaptera genera